The sixth season of The Golden Girls premiered on NBC on September 22, 1990, and concluded on May 4, 1991. The season consisted of 26 episodes.

Broadcast history
The season originally aired Saturdays at 9:00-9:30 pm (EST) on NBC from September 22, 1990 to May 4, 1991.

Episodes

References

External links

Golden Girls (season 6)
1990 American television seasons
1991 American television seasons